Attagenus is a genus of beetles. This genus is found in tropical Africa, the Palearctic including Europe, the Near East, the Nearctic, North Africa and East Asia. There are nearly 200 species. The genus has existed for at least 99 million years, with fossils known from the Cenomanian aged Burmese amber and Turonian aged New Jersey amber.

Species include:

 Attagenus abbreviatus Heer, 1856
 Attagenus aboriginalis Wickham, 1913
 Attagenus addendus J. Sahlberg, 1903
 Attagenus adspersus Blanchard, 1843
 Attagenus aeneus Roth, 1851
 Attagenus afghanus Háva, 2000
 Attagenus africanus Mroczkowski, 1958
 Attagenus albofasciatus Dahl, 1823
 Attagenus albonotatus Pic, 1927
 Attagenus ambericus Háva & Prokop, 2004
 Attagenus antennatus Laporte, 1840
 Attagenus anthrenoides Wollaston, 1864
 Attagenus apicalis Pic, 1942
 Attagenus apicebrunneus Kalík, 1955
 Attagenus arboreus Zhantiev, 2007
 Attagenus arcuatefasciatus Pic, 1951
 Attagenus aristidis Pic, 1894
 Attagenus asmaranus Pic, 1942
 Attagenus assuanensis Pic, 1899
 Attagenus astacurus Peyerimhoff, 1931
 Attagenus atricolor Pic, 1931
 Attagenus atripennis Pic, 1938
 Attagenus attenuatus Pic, 1894
 Attagenus augustatus Ballion, 1871
 Attagenus aurantiacus Reitter, 1900
 Attagenus aurofasciatus Háva, 2005
 Attagenus australis Montrouzier, 1860
 Attagenus barbieri Pic, 1946
 Attagenus basalis Pic, 1928
 Attagenus basimaculatus Pic, 1952
 Attagenus beali Zhantiev, 2005
 Attagenus bezdeki Háva & Kadej, 2007
 Attagenus bicolor Dejean, 1821
 Attagenus bicolor Harold, 1868
 Attagenus bifasciatus Olivier, 1790
 Attagenus birmanicus Arrow, 1915
 Attagenus biskrensis Pic, 1904
 Attagenus brittoni Kalík, 1954
 Attagenus brunneonotatus Pic, 1894
 Attagenus brunneopunctatus Pic, 1893
 Attagenus brunnescens Pic, 1904
 Attagenus brunneus Faldermann, 1835
 Attagenus calabricus Reitter, 1881
 Attagenus capensis Dejean, 1837
 Attagenus capensis Reitter, 1881
 Attagenus caracal Zhantiev, 1963
 Attagenus cayennensis Dejean, 1821
 Attagenus chakouri Pic, 1907
 Attagenus cinereus Thunberg, 1815
 Attagenus civetta Mulsant & Rey, 1868
 Attagenus conradsi Pic, 1951
 Attagenus coquereli Mulsant & Rey, 1868
 Attagenus cuneatus Zhantiev, 2007
 Attagenus curvicornis J. Sahlberg, 1913
 Attagenus cyphonoides Reitter, 1881
 Attagenus decoloratus Mulsant & Rey, 1868
 Attagenus dichrous Roth, 1851
 Attagenus dispar (Redtenbacher, 1843)
 Attagenus diversepubescens Pic, 1936
 Attagenus diversesignatus Pic, 1942
 Attagenus diversus Reitter, 1881
 Attagenus donckieri Pic, 1916
 Attagenus doricus Zhantiev, 2007
 Attagenus duplex Reitter in Heyden, 1890
 Attagenus endroedyi Háva, 2003
 Attagenus ensicornis Wollaston, 1867
 Attagenus eremivagus Peyerimhoff, 1943
 Attagenus erevanicus Zhantiev, 1963
 Attagenus extinctus C. Heyden & L. Heyden, 1865
 Attagenus fairmairei Mroczkowski, 1958
 Attagenus fallax Gené, 1839
 Attagenus fasciatopunctatus Reitter, 1881
 Attagenus fasciatus Thunberg, 1795 – wardrobe beetle
 Attagenus fasciolatus Solsky, 1876
 Attagenus flavicornis Dejean, 1821
 Attagenus flexicollis Reitter, 1881
 Attagenus fortis Zhantiev, 2007
 Attagenus fossor Zhantiev, 2005
 Attagenus fulvicollis Reitter, 1881
 Attagenus fulvipes Dahl, 1823
 Attagenus gilanicus Zhantiev, 2007
 Attagenus globosus Háva, 2003
 Attagenus gobicola Frivaldszky, 1892
 Attagenus granarius Dejean, 1837
 Attagenus grandjeani Pic, 1942
 Attagenus grisescens Pic, 1937
 Attagenus haladai Háva, 2006
 Attagenus hargreavesi Pic, 1935
 Attagenus havai Kadej, 2006
 Attagenus heinigi Herrmann & Háva, 2007
 Attagenus heydeni Reitter, 1881
 Attagenus hirtulus Rosenhauer, 1856
 Attagenus hirtus Sturm, 1826
 Attagenus hoffeinsorum Háva, Prokop & Herrmann, 2006
 Attagenus holmi Kalík & Háva, 2005
 Attagenus hottentotus Guérin -Méneville, 1844
 Attagenus inapicalis Pic, 1951
 Attagenus incertus Mulsant & Rey, 1868
 Attagenus incognitus Háva, 2003
 Attagenus indicus Kalík, 1954
 Attagenus insidiosus Halstead, 1981
 Attagenus insignatus Pic, 1942
 Attagenus ionicus Zhantiev, 2005
 Attagenus irroratus Blackburn, 1903
 Attagenus jacobsoni Zhantiev, 1963
 Attagenus jelineki Háva, 2004
 Attagenus jucundus Péringuey, 1885
 Attagenus karnali Háva, 2001
 Attagenus kephallenicus Háva & Kalík, 2006
 Attagenus korotyaevi Zhantiev, 2005
 Attagenus kratochvili Kalík, 1955
 Attagenus lategriseus Kalík, 1955
 Attagenus latepubescens Pic, 1952
 Attagenus leopardinus Reitter, 1881
 Attagenus lepidus Háva & Kovarík, 2004
 Attagenus leprieuri Reitter, 1887
 Attagenus lineatus Pic, 1894
 Attagenus lobatus Rosenhauer, 1856
 Attagenus longipennis Pic, 1904
 Attagenus luctuosus Dejean, 1837
 Attagenus luteithorax Pic, 1931
 Attagenus luteofasciatus Pic, 1937
 Attagenus lynx Mulsant & Rey, 1868
 Attagenus maculatus Kalík, 2006
 Attagenus madecassus Pic, 1916
 Attagenus madoni Pic, 1942
 Attagenus maritimus Gené, 1839
 Attagenus melanocerus Dejean, 1837
 Attagenus mongolicus Zhantiev, 1973
 Attagenus multifasciatus Wollaston, 1863
 Attagenus nepalensis Háva, 2001
 Attagenus nigripennis Arrow, 1915
 Attagenus nigroapicalis Pic, 1931
 Attagenus nigroluteus Kalík, 1955
 Attagenus niseteoi Dejean, 1821
 Attagenus obtusus Gyllenhal in Schönherr, 1808
 Attagenus orientalis Reitter in Schneider & Leder, 1878
 Attagenus pallidus Zhantiev, 2005
 Attagenus pantherinus Ahrens, 1814
 Attagenus pardus Arrow, 1915
 Attagenus pellio Linnaeus, 1758
 Attagenus persicus Reitter, 1881
 Attagenus pictus Ballion, 1871
 Attagenus placitus Normand, 1949
 Attagenus postfasciatus Pic, 1951
 Attagenus posticalis Fairmaire, 1879
 Attagenus prescutellaris Pic, 1927
 Attagenus pseudomolitor Zhantiev, 1963
 Attagenus pubescens Pic, 1894
 Attagenus punctatus Scopoli, 1772
 Attagenus pustulatus Thunberg, 1815
 Attagenus quadricolor Sumakov, 1907
 Attagenus quadrimaculatus Kraatz, 1858
 Attagenus quadrinotatus Pic, 1938
 Attagenus quadritinctus Reitter, 1889
 Attagenus reitteri Mroczkowski, 1968
 Attagenus rhodesianus Pic, 1927
 Attagenus robustior Pic, 1951
 Attagenus robustus Pic, 1899
 Attagenus roeri Kalík
 Attagenus rossii Ganglbauer, 1904
 Attagenus ruficollis Christofori & Jan, 1832
 Attagenus ruficolor Pic, 1918
 Attagenus rufimembris Pic, 1927
 Attagenus rufipennis LeConte, 1859
 Attagenus rufipes Sturm, 1843
 Attagenus rufiventris Pic, 1927
 Attagenus rufomaculatus Pic, 1907
 Attagenus scalaris (Pic, 1894)
 Attagenus schaefferi Herbst, 1792
 Attagenus seminiger Fairmaire, 1863
 Attagenus seniculus Solsky, 1876
 Attagenus sericeus Guérin-Méneville, 1844
 Attagenus sexnotatus Pic, 1927
 Attagenus sieversi Reitter, 1896
 Attagenus signatus Dejean, 1837
 Attagenus silvaticus Zhantiev, 1976
 Attagenus similaris Mulsant & Rey, 1868
 Attagenus simonis Reitter, 1881
 Attagenus simplex Reitter, 1881
 Attagenus sinensis Pic, 1927
 Attagenus smirnovi Zhantiev, 1973
 Attagenus somalicus Háva, 2003
 Attagenus sopitus Scudder, 1900
 Attagenus sparsutus Reitter, 1881
 Attagenus stachi Mroczkowski, 1958
 Attagenus steinbergi Zhantiev, 1963
 Attagenus suspiciosus Solsky, 1876
 Attagenus syriacus Dejean, 1837
 Attagenus taeniatus Dejean, 1837
 Attagenus tessellatus Reitter, 1887
 Attagenus thunbergi Mroczkowski, 1968
 Attagenus tigrinus Fabricius, 1792
 Attagenus tomentosus Sturm, 1843
 Attagenus trifasciatus Fabricius, 1787
 Attagenus turcomanus Zhantiev, 1963
 Attagenus undulatus Motschulsky, 1858
 Attagenus unicolor (Brahm, 1790) – black carpet beetle
 Attagenus unifasciatus Sturm, 1843
 Attagenus uniformis Fairmaire in Fairmaire & Coquerel, 1860
 Attagenus vagepictus Fairmaire, 1889
 Attagenus vestitus Klug, 1855
 Attagenus vestitus Sturm, 1843
 Attagenus wollastoni Mroczkowski, 1964
 Attagenus woodroffei Halstead & Green, 1979
 Attagenus xanthocerus Dejean, 1837
 Attagenus zavattarii Pic, 1952

References

Dermestidae genera